HMS Talavera was a 74-gun third rate ship of the line of the Royal Navy, launched on 15 October 1818 at Woolwich Dockyard. She was named for the British/Spanish victory at the Battle of Talavera.

She was destroyed in 1840 at Devonport dockyard in a large scale fire on 25 September 1840, which started in the North Dock. Estimates for the damage were put at £150,000 in then money, and would have totalled £500,000 had the fire not been contained.

Notes

References

Lavery, Brian (2003) The Ship of the Line - Volume 1: The development of the battlefleet 1650–1850. Conway Maritime Press. .

Ships of the line of the Royal Navy
Repulse-class ships of the line
1818 ships